The Museu da Água  (Water Museum) is located  in Lisbon, Portugal. 

The museum, the former steam pumping station of Barbadinhos, Lisbon, built in 1880, is in  a 19th-century industrial building. The museum features four large steam engines dating from 1880. One has been reconditioned as a working demonstration. The pumps were in use until 1928. The museum also features portions of Lisbon's 1746 aqueduct. 

In 1990 the museum was awarded the Council of Europe Museum Prize.

References

External links
Water Museum photo gallery

Museums in Lisbon
Steam museums
Former pumping stations